Ingrid Kristina Carlqvist (born 9 November 1960) is a Swedish journalist and member of the white supremacist organization Asatru Folk Assembly. According to Expo, Carlqvist is a far-right extremist with close ties to the white supremacist milieu in Sweden.

Early life 

Carlqvist was born on 9 November 1960 in Vantörs Township, and was raised in Helsingborg. She studied at the School of Journalism in Gothenburg.

Career 

In 2009, Carlqvist was fired by the magazine Villaliv, and in 2011 she was fired by the newspaper Barometern. According to Carlqvist, she was fired from Barometern for blogging in defense of the Sweden Democratic Youth, which at the time was the youth league of the Sweden Democrats.

In July 2012, she founded the Swedish language news-sheet Dispatch International with Lars Hedegaard, which was distributed by the Sweden Democrats as part of its election campaign. The publication's general theme was islamophobia, and its stated purpose was, according to Carlqvist, "to report what was not being reported" in the Swedish mainstream media with regard to Third World mass immigration into Swedish society.

She was employed by the Gatestone Institute until 2016.

In the United Kingdom's politics she endorsed Anne Marie Waters for the 2017 UK Independence Party leadership election, who came in second place.

Carlqvist has been described as engaging in Holocaust denial by Hope not Hate.

Publications 

2005 - Ego girl (with Carolina Gynning) 
2009 - Ego woman (with Carolina Gynning) 
2009 - Inte utan mina söner  
2009 - Ljusfolket (with Benny Rosenqvist) 
2010 - Keith och jag
2010 - Mellan himmel och jord (with Benny Rosenqvist) 
2012 - Horungen
2012 - Mina år med Bin Ladens (with Catrin Streete)
2012 - Din innersta fruktan (with Benny Rosenqvist) 
2018 - Från Sverige till Absurdistan

References

External links 

Dispatch International
Carlqvist's English-language work
Official Website of Ingrid Carlqvist

1960 births
Living people
Swedish journalists
Anti-Islam sentiment in Sweden
Swedish modern pagans
Swedish Holocaust deniers
People from Helsingborg